= Villa Zirio =

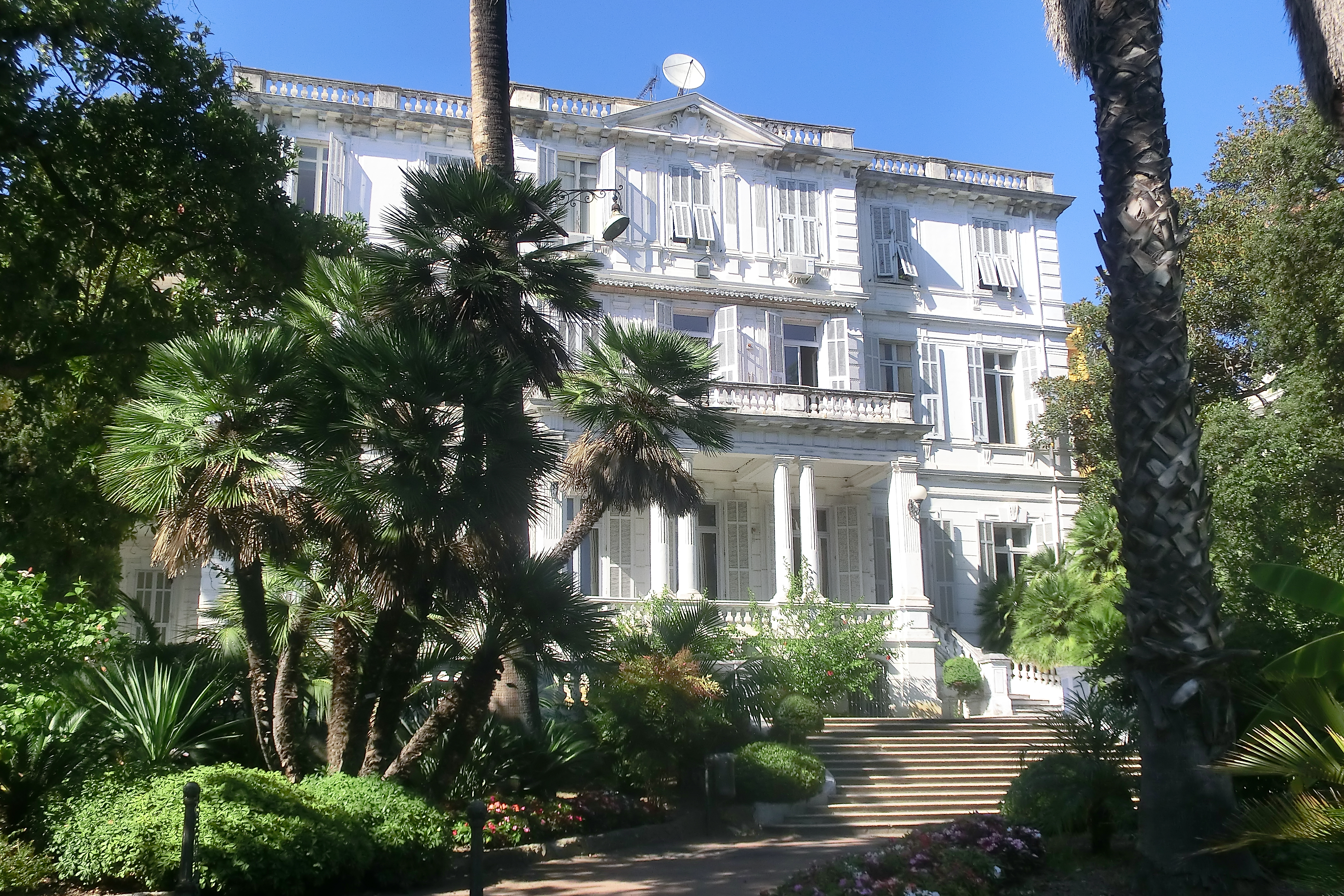
- Villa Zirio in 2013
- Click on the map for a fullscreen view

General information
- Location: Sanremo, Italy
- Coordinates: 43°49′19.42″N 7°47′08.61″E

Villa Zirio is a historic villa located in Sanremo, Italy.

== History ==
The villa was built in 1868 by the wealthy lawyer from Sanremo, Giovanni Battista Zirio, who at the time was working as a banker in Marseille. It was designed by the architect Bérengier from Marseille, while the construction contract was awarded to the firm Curti & Gibert.

After the death of Giovanni Battista Zirio, his widow — founder of the Sanremo Red Cross — married Marquis Agostino Borea d’Olmo. The villa was later acquired by Senator Ernesto Marsaglia. He rented it out for a period to the future Emperor Frederick III of Germany, who stayed in Sanremo for health reasons with his wife and three daughters between 1887 and 1888.

== Description ==
The villa stands along Corso Felice Cavallotti, next to Palazzo Bellevue and just a short distance from the seafront.

The building, which has three floors, features an almost symmetrical floor plan.
